In United Nations Security Council Resolution 417, adopted on October 31, 1977, after reaffirming Resolution 392 (1976), the Council condemned the continuing repression against black people and other opponents of apartheid, as well as the South African media and the mounting deaths of detainees. The Council foresaw that the continuation of such activities would lead to serious racial conflict with international repercussions.

The resolution demanded therefore, that the Government of South Africa:

 (a) end the violence against the opponents of apartheid;
 (b) release all persons held under arbitrary security laws;
 (c) cease its violent response to demonstrations against apartheid;
 (d) remove bans on news media opposed to apartheid;
 (e) abolish the "Bantu education system" and the bantustans.

The resolution went on to ask Member States to support the resolution and provide assistance to those fleeing South Africa. It also requested the Secretary-General Kurt Waldheim, along with the Special Committee against Apartheid, to monitor the situation and issue a report on the implementation of Resolution 417 by February 17, 1978.

The meeting, called for by Tunisia in light of the repressive measures adopted by South Africa, adopted the resolution unanimously. Three previous draft resolutions were rejected due to objections by some permanent members of the Council.

See also
 List of United Nations Security Council Resolutions 401 to 500 (1976–1982)
 South Africa under apartheid

References

External links
 
Text of the Resolution at undocs.org

 0417
United Nations Security Council Resolution 417
 0417
October 1977 events